Gil Blake is a speculator investor and fund manager who devised an investment strategy known as mutual fund market timing. This method of investing is based on the historic pricing patterns of mutual funds.

Career 
Blake has attributed his participation in trading to a friend of his, who had shown him some municipal bonds and inquired for Blake's opinion. Blake noticed a trend in the numbers his colleague had showed him, and investigated further. His investigation led to the discovery that persistent trends in municipal bonds were decidedly systematic. This served as the basis of his mutual fund timing strategies. According to Barron's, Blake placed second in the U.S. Trading Championships in 1988 and first in 1989-1993.. According to Andrew Selby's posting on www.donttalkaboutyourstocks.com/market-wizard-gil-blake/ on February 26, 2013 his top five quotes from Gil Blake listed in Jack Schwager's book Market Wizards (1992) were: Quote #1: "I'm not a big fan of diversification. If the odds are 70 percent in your favor and you make fifty trades, it's very difficult to have a down year."  Quote #2: "Whenever I take a position, I like to imagine what it would be like under the worst-case scenario. In doing so, I minimize the confusion if that situation actually develops. In my view, losses are a very important part of trading. When a loss happens, I believe in embracing it."  Quote #3: "The lesson for me was that if you break a discipline once, the next transgression becomes much easier. Breaking a diet provides an appropriate analogy – once you do it, it becomes much easier to make further exceptions." Quote #4: "Opportunities change, strategies change, but people and psychology do not change. If trend following systems don't work as well, something else will. There's always money being lost, so someone out there has to win." and Quote #5: "First of all, most traders don't have a winning strategy. Second, even among those traders who do, many don't follow their strategy. Trading puts pressure on weaker human traits and seems to seek out each individual's Achilles' heel."

Biography 
Mr. Blake was born July 14, 1945 in New York, NY

References

Sources

Further reading 

1945 births
Living people
American accountants
American investors
American money managers
American financial analysts
American hedge fund managers
Stock and commodity market managers
Wharton School of the University of Pennsylvania alumni

20th-century American businesspeople
Cornell University alumni